The 1966–67 Mexican Segunda División was the 17th season of the Mexican Segunda División. The season started on 6 August 1966 and concluded on 5 March 1967. It was won by Pachuca.

Changes 
 Nuevo León was promoted to Primera División.
 Zacatepec was relegated from Primera División.

Teams

League table

Results

References 

1966–67 in Mexican football
Segunda División de México seasons